The 2014–15 Cymru Alliance (known as the Huws Gray Alliance for sponsorship reasons) is a football league in Wales. It is the top division of football in North & Central Wales and the second tier of the Welsh football league system.

The reigning champions are Cefn Druids. They were promoted to the Welsh Premier League.

Promotion and relegation 
Teams promoted from 2013–14 feeder leagues
 Denbigh Town – Welsh Alliance League champions
 Llandrindod Wells – Mid Wales League champions
 Mold Alexandra – Welsh National League (Wrexham Area) champions

Teams relegated from 2013–14 Welsh Premier League
 None

Stadia and locations

League table

References

Cymru Alliance seasons
2014–15 in Welsh football leagues
Wales